Hold-up  is a 2020 independent pseudoscience propaganda film directed by French conspiracy theorist . The film makes a number of false claims about the COVID-19 pandemic. Hold-Up was first released as a VoD on Vimeo 11 November 2020. Vimeo deleted the film the next day, citing the numerous lies in the film; DailyMotion likewise removed the film the next day. The film continues to be spread on social media among QAnon supporters.

Plot
Hold-Up claims that a global conspiracy plot had been formed by the world's elites, and particularly the World Economic Forum. According to the film, the SARS-CoV-2 virus was deliberately created for an excuse to enslave humanity. A full version of the documentary that remains online has been watched more than 2,000,000 times,  while a trailer for Hold Up also remains visible on Facebook, Twitter, and YouTube. All central claims of the film have been proven to be wrong, and the producers of the film have been shown to falsify their sources and misrepresent statements.

See also
Plandemic

References

External links
official site 
 
 Dazed & Confused: Reporting on Europe’s troubled vaccine rollout. Listening Post (Al Jazeera English), 27 March 2021 - contains a 1o minutes report on Hold-up (video, 25 mins)

2020 films
2020 documentary films
2020s French-language films
Internet manipulation and propaganda
Films about social media
Vaccine hesitancy
Medical-related conspiracy theories
Pseudoscience documentary films
COVID-19 misinformation